is a Japanese Paralympic archer from Higashiōsaka, Osaka Prefecture, Japan. He competes in the Recurve.

He has competed once at the Summer Paralympics and once at the World Para Archery Championships.

References

Paralympic archers of Japan
Archers at the 2016 Summer Paralympics
Living people
Japanese male archers
1987 births